Justice Phelps may refer to:

James Phelps (congressman), judge of the Connecticut Supreme Court of Errors and Appeals
James I. Phelps, associate justice of the Oklahoma Supreme Court
Marlin T. Phelps, associate justice of the Arizona Supreme Court
Samuel S. Phelps, associate justice of the Vermont Supreme Court